Thomas Raikes ("the Elder") (28 March 1741 – 29 December 1813) was a British merchant particularly trading from London with Russia, a banker and newspaper proprietor. Notably, he was Governor of the Bank of England during the 1797 currency crisis, when the Bank was prohibited by the British Government from paying out in gold.

Biography 
Raikes was born at Gloucester in 1741, third son of Robert Raikes the Elder and Mary Drew. His brothers included Robert Raikes, the founder and promoter of Sunday schools, and William Raikes, a director of the South Sea Company.

Raikes was Governor of the Bank of England from 1797 to 1799, during the crisis of 1797 when war had so diminished gold reserves that the Government prohibited the Bank from paying out in gold and ordered the use of banknotes instead.

Thomas Raikes was a personal friend of Prime Minister William Pitt the Younger, and of William Wilberforce, the leader of the campaign against the slave trade.

Raikes died at Stanwell House, Middlesex 29 December 1813.

Family
On 8 December 1774 at St George's, Bloomsbury, London, Raikes married Charlotte, daughter of Henry Finch, and granddaughter of Daniel Finch, 2nd Earl of Nottingham. With Charlotte he had four sons and five daughters.  Their eldest son Thomas became a noted London diarist; another son, Henry, became a churchman, eventually Chancellor of the Diocese of Chester. One of their daughters, Georgiana (d. 2 December 1861), married Lord William FitzRoy.

References
Notes

Bibliography
Frank Booth  Robert Raikes of Gloucester published 1980.
John Clapham    History of the Bank of England
Alfred Gregory,  Robert Raikes Journalist & Philanthropist published by Hodder and Stoughton 1880
J M Harris  Robert Raikes, the man and his works.
Kent's Directory for the Year 1794. Cities of London and Westminster, & Borough of Southwark.
Duncan Raikes (compiled by), Pedigree of Raikes published 1980 by Phillimore  based on the 1930 "privately printed" edition also published by Phillimore.
Senate House Library, University of London: Raikes, Thomas : An account book covering the period 31 March 1802 – 31 October 1808.

1741 births
1813 deaths
English bankers
People from Gloucester
Governors of the Bank of England
Deputy Governors of the Bank of England
Raikes family